Alppila Upper Secondary School (Finnish: Alppilan Lukio) is a school located in Helsinki, Finland. The school was founded in 1959. The current principal is Susanna Kalmari. There are around 700 students.

Notable alumni
Paavo Arhinmäki, Member of the Parliament of Finland
Renny Harlin, director

References

External links
Alppila Upper Secondary School

Educational institutions established in 1959
Schools in Helsinki
Secondary schools in Finland
1959 establishments in Finland